Longchamps is a city in Greater Buenos Aires, Argentina, located about 30 km south of Buenos Aires, in the Almirante Brown Partido (district).

The city owes its name to the race track of the same name located on the Route des Tribunes in the Bois de Boulogne at Paris, France, after which the Sociedad Hípica de Lomas de Zamora (Hipic Society of Lomas de Zamora) was inspired to name the city's own racecourse.

As many people started to visit the new racetrack, the Hipic Society saw itself obligated to create a Railway stop on the current Roca Railway (Ferrocarril General Roca); the stop's foundation date is also used as the foundation date of the city: August 10, 1910. Ultimately, a gambler's dispute that ended in a fire destroyed the racetrack.

It is home of the Danone factory for Argentina.

External links
Municipal website 

Almirante Brown Partido
Populated places in Buenos Aires Province
Populated places established in 1910
Cities in Argentina